The Miss Kansas Basketball honor recognizes the top girls’ high school basketball player in the state of Kansas. The award is presented annually by the Kansas Basketball Coaches Association.

Award winners

Schools with multiple winners

See also
Mr. Kansas Basketball

References

Kansas
High school sports in Kansas
Awards established in 1983
Women's sports in Kansas
Basketball in Kansas
Basketball players from Kansas
Lists of people from Kansas
Lists of American sportswomen
Kansas sports-related lists